Anthony Haswell may refer to:
Anthony Haswell (passenger rail advocate)
Anthony Haswell (printer)